A referendum on the new constitution of France was held in French Sudan on 28 September 1958 as part of a wider referendum held across the French Union. The new constitution would see the country become part of the new French Community if accepted, or result in independence if rejected. It was approved by 97.54% of voters.

Results

References

Constitutional referendum
1958 referendums
September 1958 events in Africa
1958
Constitutional referendums